Henry "Hank, Red" Bassen (December 6, 1932 – May 29, 2009) was a Canadian ice hockey goaltender. He played in the National Hockey League for the Chicago Black Hawks, Detroit Red Wings and Pittsburgh Penguins between 1954 and 1968. He was the father of Bob Bassen, who played 765 regular-season games in the NHL.

Playing career
Bassen began his NHL career in 1954 with the Chicago Black Hawks where he spent two seasons as the backup to Al Rollins. Bassen went on to have starting roles in the Western Hockey League for the Calgary Stampeders, Seattle Americans and the Vancouver Canucks before moving to the Detroit Red Wings where over three seasons he would serve as the backup to Terry Sawchuk between 1960 and 1963.

During the 1963–64 season, Bassen played seven games with the Indianapolis Capitals/Cincinnati Wings in the CPHL and 26 games with the Pittsburgh Hornets in the AHL.

After spending most of the season with the Pittsburgh Hornets, Bassen returned to the Red Wings roster to serve as a backup once more, this time to Roger Crozier during the 1963–64 NHL season. He played one final year with the Pittsburgh Penguins, backing up Les Binkley before retiring in 1968.

After retiring Bassen managed the junior Calgary Wranglers from 1984 to 1986, and had two sons go on to play professional hockey.

Bassen died on May 29, 2009 of heart failure at age 76.

Career statistics

Regular season and playoffs

Awards and achievements
 WCJHL Second All-Star Team (1950)
 WCJHL First All-Star Team (1952)
 OHA Sr First All-Star Team (1954)
 WHL First All-Star Team (1960)
 Outstanding Goaltender Award (fewest goals against - WHL) (1960)
 Leader Cup (MVP - WHL) (co-winner - Guyle Fielder) (1960)

References

External links
 

1932 births
2009 deaths
Buffalo Bisons (AHL) players
Calgary Stampeders (WHL) players
Calgary Wranglers coaches
Canadian ice hockey coaches
Canadian ice hockey goaltenders
Canadian people of German descent
Chicago Blackhawks players
Cincinnati Wings players
Detroit Red Wings players
Edmonton Flyers (WHL) players
Medicine Hat Tigers players
Ontario Hockey Association Senior A League (1890–1979) players
Pittsburgh Hornets players
Pittsburgh Penguins players
Seattle Americans players
Ice hockey people from Calgary
Springfield Indians players
Vancouver Canucks (WHL) players